Anderseniella baltica is a bacterium species from the genus of Anderseniella which has been isolated from the Baltic Sea.

References

Further reading

External links
Type strain of Anderseniella baltica at BacDive -  the Bacterial Diversity Metadatabase

Hyphomicrobiales
Bacteria described in 2007